Pseudolucia is a genus of butterflies in the family Lycaenidae. They are predominantly found in parts of South America, south of Brazil.  In many of the southern and western regions, stretching from Chile to Uruguay, habitat loss and pollution have led to near extinction.

Species
 Pseudolucia andina (Bartlett-Calvert, 1894) – Andean blue
 Pseudolucia annamaria Bálint & Johnson, 1993
 Pseudolucia arauco Bálint, Benyamini & Johnson, 2001
 Pseudolucia argentinina (Balletto, 1993) – Argentine blue
 Pseudolucia asafi Benyamini, Bálint & Johnson, 1995
 Pseudolucia avishai Benyamini, Bálint & Johnson, 1995
 Pseudolucia aureliana Bálint & Johnson, 1993
 Pseudolucia benyamini Bálint & Johnson, 1995 – Dubi's blue
 Pseudolucia charlotte Bálint & Johnson, 1993
 Pseudolucia chilensis (Blanchard, 1852)
 Pseudolucia clarea Bálint & Johnson, 1993
 Pseudolucia collina (Philippi, 1859)
 Pseudolucia dubi Bálint, 2001
 Pseudolucia grata (Köhler, 1934)
 Pseudolucia gornia
 Pseudolucia hazearum Bálint & Johnson, 1993
 Pseudolucia henyah Bálint, Benyamini & Johnson, 2001
 Pseudolucia humbert Bálint & Johnson, 1995
 Pseudolucia jujuyensis
 Pseudolucia kechico Bálint, Benyamini & Johnson, 2001
 Pseudolucia kinbote Bálint & Johnson, 1993 – flashing blue or Kinbote's blue
 Pseudolucia lanin Bálint & Johnson, 1993
 Pseudolucia magellana Benyamini, Bálint & Johnson, 1995
 Pseudolucia neuqueniensis Bálint & Johnson, 1995
 Pseudolucia norris
 Pseudolucia oligocyanea (Ureta, 1956) – Tumbre blue
 Pseudolucia oraria Bálint & Benyamini, 2001
 Pseudolucia parana Bálint, 1993
 Pseudolucia patago
 Pseudolucia penai Bálint & Johnson, 1993
 Pseudolucia plumbea (Butler, 1881)
 Pseudolucia scintilla (Balletto, 1993)
 Pseudolucia shapiroi Bálint & Johnson, 1995
 Pseudolucia sibyllia (Kirby, 1871) – southern blue
 Pseudolucia talia Bálint, Benyamini & Johnson, 1995
 Pseudolucia tamara Bálint & Johnson, 1995
 Pseudolucia ugartei Bálint & Benyamini, 2001
 Pseudolucia vera Bálint & Johnson, 1993
 Pseudolucia whitakeri Bálint & Johnson, 1995
 Pseudolucia zina Bálint & Johnson, 1995

References

External links
Butterflies of America
 Images representing Pseudolucia   at Consortium for the Barcode of Life

Polyommatini
Lycaenidae of South America
Lycaenidae genera